
The Indianapolis Indiana Temple is a temple of the Church of Jesus Christ of Latter-day Saints (LDS Church) located at the southwest corner of West 116th Street and Spring Mill Road in Carmel, Indiana, north of Indianapolis. It is the first temple constructed in Indiana. The Indianapolis Indiana Temple is similar in design to The Gila Valley Arizona Temple, a single-level temple with an end spire and approximately 34,000 square feet.

History
The intention to build the temple was announced by church president Thomas S. Monson on October 2, 2010, during the church's semi-annual general conference. The temple was announced concurrently with the Hartford Connecticut, Tijuana Mexico, Urdaneta Philippines and Lisbon Portugal temples.

A groundbreaking ceremony was held September 29, 2012, with Donald L. Hallstrom presiding.

A public open house was held from July 17 to August 8, 2015, excluding Sundays. The temple was dedicated by Henry B. Eyring on August 23, 2015. Church officials said it will serve about 30,000 members in Indiana and eastern Illinois.

In 2020, the Indianapolis Indiana Temple was closed in response to the coronavirus pandemic.

See also

 Comparison of temples of The Church of Jesus Christ of Latter-day Saints
 List of temples of The Church of Jesus Christ of Latter-day Saints
 List of temples of The Church of Jesus Christ of Latter-day Saints by geographic region
 Temple architecture (Latter-day Saints)
 The Church of Jesus Christ of Latter-day Saints in Indiana

References

External links
Indianapolis Indiana Temple Official site
Indianapolis Indiana Temple at ChurchofJesusChristTemples.org

21st-century Latter Day Saint temples
Buildings and structures in Indianapolis
Carmel, Indiana
Religious buildings and structures in Indiana
Religious buildings and structures completed in 2015
2015 establishments in Indiana
2015 in Christianity
Christianity in Indiana